Chan I-hua (22 February 1957 — 19 May 1989) was a Taiwanese pro-democracy activist and graduate of Lunghwa University of Science and Technology.  He performed self-immolation on May 19, 1989 when the funeral procession of fellow activist Cheng Nan-jung (who had similarly immolated himself) was blocked by the police in front of the Presidential Office Building in Taipei on what is now called Ketagalan Boulevard.

See also
 List of political self-immolations
 Cheng Nan-jung
 Taiwan independence

References

External links
 twhistory.org.tw - From mastering people to people as masters

1957 births
1989 suicides
People from Chiayi County
Suicides by self-immolation
Suicides in Taiwan
Taiwan independence activists